Caribou Mountain is a large hill in Northeastern Ontario, Canada, located  east of the village of Temagami. Its steep cliff overlooks the village of Temagami and is the closest lookout point to the village. Caribou Mountain, as well as the surrounding area, is situated in the Municipality of Temagami.

See also
Maple Mountain
Ishpatina Ridge

External links

Strathy Township
Mountains of Ontario
Landforms of Temagami
Mountains of Canada under 1000 metres